The Sinfonieorchester Basel (Symphony Orchestra Basel; Swiss abbreviation SOB) is a symphony orchestra based in Basel, Switzerland.  Its principal concert venue is the Musiksaal of the Stadtcasino. In addition, the orchestra accompanies ballet and opera productions with Theater Basel, and records prolifically, often for Sony Classical.

History 
The orchestra was founded in 1876, in the same year as the music hall Basel (Stadtcasino Basel) was constructed. During its history, the orchestra gave the world premieres of works by such composers as Béla Bartók, Arthur Honegger and Bohuslav Martinů. The orchestra holds its present name of 'Sinfonieorchester Basel' since 1997, when the two orchestras Basler Sinfonie-Orchester and Radio Sinfonieorchester merged into one ensemble.  Another milestone in the history of the orchestra was set in 2012, when the Sinfonieorchester Basel and the organizer of many years AMG (in German Allgemeine Musikgesellschaft Basel) decided to go separate ways. Henceforward, the Sinfonieorchester Basel has been organizing its own subscription concerts.

From 2009 to 2016, the orchestra's chief conductor was Dennis Russell Davies. In June 2015, the orchestra announced the appointment of Ivor Bolton as its next chief conductor, as of the 2016–17 season, with an initial contract of four years.  Michał Nesterowicz became the orchestra's principal guest conductor as of the 2016–17 season.

Chief Conductors
 Mario Venzago (1997-2003)
 Marko Letonja (2003-2006)
 Dennis Russell Davies (2009-2016)
 Ivor Bolton (2016-present)

Awards 
The recording 'A different Schumann Vol. 1-3' was awarded the Diapason d’Or in May 2004. The orchestra received the Diapason d'Or for the recording 'Felix Weingartner: Symphonic works I' in September 2005. The recording "Le Sacre du Printemps" received the Supersonic-Prize and was nominated for the ICMA Music Award 2015.

Discography 
 Millistrade, Musikalisches Singspiel von Marius Felix Lange und Linard Bardill
 Of Madness and Love, Works by Hector Berlioz, inspired by William Shakespeare
 Franz Schubert: Symphonies No. 2 & 6
 Igor Stravinsky: Le Sacre du Printemps
 Philip Glass: Symphony No. 4 "Heroes" from the music of David Bowie and Brian Eno 
 Philip Glass: Symphony No. 1, "Low"
 Arthur Honegger: Symphonies No. 2 & 4 "Deliciae Basiliensis"
 Franz Schubert: Symphonies No. 8, "Grosse C-Dur-Sinfonie"
 Arthur Honegger: Symphonies No. 3 & 1
 Franz Schubert: Symphonies No. 3 & 5
 Es ist ein Ros' entsprungen: Romantic Music for Christmas
 Anton Bruckner: Symphonies No. 4 & 7
 Felix Weingartner: Symphonic works I
 Felix Weingartner: Symphonic works II
 Felix Weingartner: Symphonic works III
 Felix Weingartner: Symphonic works IV
 Felix Weingartner: Symphonic works V
 Felix Weingartner: Symphonic works VI
 Felix Weingartner: Symphonic works VII
 Robert Schumann: A Different Schumann Vol. 1
 Robert Schumann: A Different Schumann Vol. 2
 Robert Schumann: A Different Schumann Vol. 3
 Maurice Ravel: Works for Orchestra
 Bohuslav Martinů: Concerts for Piano
 Luigi Nono: Various Works 
 Iannis Xenakis: Kraanerg, ballet music for orchestra and tape 
 Klaus Huber: Schwarzerde
 Wladimir Vogel: Various works
 Frédéric Chopin: Works for Piano and Orchestra
 Thomas Kessler: Various works
 Othmar Schoeck: Penthesilea

Literature 
 Tilman Seebass: 100 Jahre AMG - Die Allgemeine Musikgesellschaft Basel 1876-1976.
 Rudolf Häusler: AMG - Allgemeine Musikgesellschaft Basel 1976-2001: Eine Festschrift zum 125-Jahr-Jubiläum. 
 Dr. Hans Ziegler: Geschichte der Basler Orchester-Gesellschaft 1922-1970. Verlag Krebs AG, Basel.
 Sigfried Schibli: Geschichte der Basler Orchester-Gesellschaft 1971-2003. Verlag Krebs AG, Basel 2009.

References

External links
 Official Sinfonieorchester Basel homepage, German-language
 Official Sinfonieorchester Basel homepage, English-language

Musical groups established in 1997
Swiss orchestras
1876 establishments in Switzerland